Wario: Master of Disguise is a platform game developed by Suzak and published by Nintendo for the Nintendo DS. The game was released on January 18, 2007 in Japan, and on March 5 in North America. Its Japanese title, Phantom Thief Wario the Seven, refers to the fact that he has seven "forms" (other than his normal "Thief" form). The game was released on the Wii U's Virtual Console in PAL regions and Japan in 2015 and North America in 2016.

Gameplay
Wario: Master of Disguise has the player access new areas of the map after unlocking new items and abilities, similar to a metroidvania. The player maneuvers Wario with either the directional pad or the A, B, X and Y buttons. All other actions are controlled by the touch-screen. To advance through levels, the player is required to take advantage of various different forms of Wario. Like Wario Land 4, Wario: Master of Disguise features health as opposed to the invulnerability found in Wario Land II and Wario Land 3.

Plot
This game starts out with Wario sitting back in house, watching his television. As he flips through the channels, he comes upon a show about a thief, Silver Zephyr, who can wield various disguises. Jealous of this character, Wario quickly creates the Telmet, a helmet that allows him to enter the TV show. He steals the thief's disguise changing wand, Goodstyle, and starts looting the ocean liner that the Silver Zephyr had been about to clear out. The Silver Zephyr, now known as his regular identity, Count Cannoli, gives chase, and eventually catches up with Wario, only to be defeated. He attempts to make a deal with Wario, in an attempt to retrieve Goodstyle, but then breaks the pact when he discovers that a piece of the Wishstone, an ancient tablet that supposedly grants wishes, is being carried by the ship. Wario gets to it first, and decides to track down the rest of the five pieces. Later in some ice caves, he meets a third thief named Carpaccio who is also seeking the Wishstone.

Before entering a volcano, Wario meets a girl named Tiaramisu who really is a demon named Terrormisu sealed inside the Wishstone, but she acts like an ally at first, even helping Wario defeat a boss. In the final episode, Wario finds out about her real nature and defeats her with help from Cannoli and Carpaccio. Finally, Wario finds out that Goodstyle is actually the first of all the count Cannolis. Goodstyle grants Wario's wish for all the treasures the Cannoli clan have. But when he leaves the show, Wario does not find the money and treasures because the Telmet only teleported him out. Wario then resolves to re-enter the television to get them back. What happens afterward is never revealed.

Reception

Wario: Master of Disguise has received mixed responses among critics. GameSpot reviewer opined that while it is a passable puzzler, it lacks polish, and the touch screens were not very necessary, and thus gave it a 6.1. According to Craig Harris of IGN, the game has an "uncomfortably strange" story and plays more like a third-party game rather than a first-party.

Notes

References

External links
Official Kaitō Wario website 

2007 video games
Nintendo DS games
Nintendo DS-only games
Virtual Console games
Virtual Console games for Wii U
Wario video games
Metroidvania games
Video games developed in Japan
Wario Land
Single-player video games
Suzak Inc. games